Frieda is a river of Thuringia and Hesse, Germany. It joins the Werra in the village Frieda.

See also
List of rivers of Hesse
List of rivers of Thuringia

References

Rivers of Hesse
Rivers of Thuringia
Rivers of Germany